Tottori earthquake may refer to:
1943 Tottori earthquake
2000 Tottori earthquake
2016 Tottori earthquake